Douglas John Ardito (born March 10, 1971) is an American musician who was a member and played guitar as well as bass guitar for the band Puddle of Mudd. He is a Fender Musical Instruments endorsed artist.

Career 
Ardito co-wrote Puddle of Mudd's biggest single, "Blurry". Guitar One Magazine voted Ardito's harmonic guitar part in "Blurry" as one of the "Top Ten Riffs of the Decade". The song reached the #1 spot on the Hot Mainstream Rock Tracks and Modern Rock Tracks charts for ten and nine weeks. This soon propelled the single to mainstream success, reaching the #5 spot on the Billboard Hot 100 Airplay chart. Ardito along with the other two authors of the song won ASCAP's Song of the Year and Pop Song of the Year. "Blurry" also won two Billboard awards in 2002, for "modern rock track of the year" and "rock track of the year". It also won the Kerrang! Award for Best Single. Blurry reached #8 in the UK Singles Chart, becoming the band's highest charting single in the United Kingdom.

References

External links
Puddle of Mudd website

1971 births
Living people
American rock bass guitarists
People from Bedford, Massachusetts
Place of birth missing (living people)
American male bass guitarists
Puddle of Mudd members
21st-century American bass guitarists
21st-century American male musicians
The Wondergirls members